The Church of St Leonard is a redundant church in Chelwood, Somerset, England. It was built in  the 14th century and has been designated as a Grade II* listed building.

The church was largely rebuilt during restoration around 1860.

The font is Norman with tiny volutes at the edges and a top frieze of something like lambrequins. These have been described as the remains of locking staples used to prevent witches stealing the holy water. The stained glass has various 16th-century Flemish bits in the south aisle window.

The two stage west tower contains a bell dating from 1773 and made by Abraham Bilbie of the Bilbie family.

See also
 List of ecclesiastical parishes in the Diocese of Bath and Wells

References

Buildings and structures completed in the 14th century
14th-century church buildings in England
Church of England church buildings in Bath and North East Somerset
Grade II* listed churches in Somerset
Grade II* listed buildings in Bath and North East Somerset